Stammtisch is a German restaurant in Portland, Oregon.

Stammtish has been described as a "sister restaurant" of the Prost location on Mississippi Avenue in the Boise neighborhood.

History
The restaurant opened in May 2014.

Reception
Michael Russell included Stammtisch in The Oregonian 2019 list of the city's 40 best restaurants.

See also

 List of German restaurants

References

External links
 
 
 Stammtisch at Zomato

2014 establishments in Oregon
German restaurants in Portland, Oregon
Kerns, Portland, Oregon
Restaurants established in 2014